Donald Burrows may refer to:

Don Burrows (1928–2020), Australian jazz musician
Donald Burrows (musicologist) (born 1945), Handel scholar and professor of music at the Open University

See also
Don Burroughs (1931–2006), American football player